Graphic design is the practice of combining text with images and concepts, most often for advertisements, publications, or websites. The history of graphic design is frequently traced from the onset of moveable-type printing in the 15th century, yet earlier developments and technologies related to writing and printing can be considered as parts of the longer history of communication.

Writing

Medieval
Medieval religious illuminated manuscripts combine text and images. Among these books are the Gospel books of Insular art, created in the monasteries of the British Isles.  The graphics in these books reflect the influence of the Animal style associated with the "barbarian" peoples of Northern Europe, with much use of interlace and geometric decoration.

The Qur'an
In Islamic countries, calligraphy was a sacred aspect of the holy book of Islam, the Qur'an. Muslim scribes used black ink and golden paper to write and draw, using an angled alphabet called Kuffi, or Kufi. Such writings appeared in the 8th century and reached their apex in the 10th century. Later, decorations of the margins of pages, displaying a variety of graphic techniques, were added in order to beautify the book. In the 12th century, the Naskh alphabet was invented; it featured curves instead of the angled lines of Kufi script. Other styles, such as Mohaghegh, Reyhan, Sols, Reghaa, and Toghii, appeared later on.

Calligraphy

Playing cards
It is believed that playing cards were invented in China. Chinese playing cards, as we understand the term today, date from at least 1294, when Yen Sengzhu and Zheng Pig-Dog were apparently caught gambling in Enzhou (in modern Shandong Province). Cards entered Europe from the Islamic empire. The earliest authentic references to playing cards in Europe date from 1377. Europe changed the Islamic symbols such as scimitars and cups into graphical representations of kings, queens, knights and jesters. Different European countries adopted different suit systems. For instance, some Italian, Spanish and German decks of cards even today do not have queens. During the 15th century, German printers introduced a woodblock printing technique to produce playing cards. Lower production costs enabled the printed playing cards' quick exportation throughout Europe. The substitution of wood-block printing and hand coloring with copper-plate engraving during the 16th century was the next significant innovation in the manufacture of playing cards. The mass printing of playing cards was revolutionized by the introduction of color lithography in the early 19th century.

Communication

A rebus (Latin: "by things") is a kind of word puzzle which uses pictures to represent words or parts of words, such as "T,4,2" instead of "tea for two". In 1977, the New York State Department of Commerce recruited Milton Glaser, a productive graphic designer to work on a marketing campaign for New York State. Glaser created the rebus-style icon  which became a major success and has continued to be sold for years. Rebus has played an important role in creation of alphabets.

Heraldry
Heraldry is the practice of designing and displaying coat of arms and heraldic badge and is rather common among all nations. For example, Romans used eagle as their coat of arms, French used fleur de lis, and Persians used the sign of their god, Ahura Mazda. Historically, it has been variously described as "the shorthand of history" and "the floral border in the garden of history.". It comes from the Germanic compound *harja-waldaz, "army commander".  The origins of heraldry lie in the need to distinguish participants in combat when their faces were hidden by iron and steel helmets. Eventually a formal system of rules developed into ever more complex forms of heraldry.

Logos and trademarks
A trademark is a distinctive sign or indicator used by an individual, company or other entity to identify its products or services and to distinguish them from those of other producers. A trademark is a type of intellectual property, and typically a name, word, phrase, logo, symbol, design, image, or a combination of these elements.

Rebranding
Rebranding means staying relevant as competition heats up and sales start to stagnate. In such circumstances companies often seek to breathe new life into the brand through rebranding. The idea behind it is that the assumptions made when the brand was established may no longer hold true.

Signage of culture and peace

The logo of the Socialist Party (France). The rose symbol represents; community (the flower's petals), socialism (its red color), taking care of those who are less able to compete (the fragility), the struggle (the thorns), cultural life (beauty). Historically, the red rose became the party's emblem during the nineteen-seventies. The fist symbol was a sign of resistance. Although the Mitterrand Socialists turned the fist into a graphic holding a rose.

Known worldwide by its panda logo, the Switzerland-based World Wildlife Fund (WWF) participates in international efforts to protect endangered species and their habitats.

Médecins Sans Frontières, or Doctors Without Borders, is best known for its humanitarian projects in war-torn regions and developing countries facing endemic disease. Their logo using a minimalist approach creates its visual impact.

Information signs: ISOTYPE
In 1921, Otto Neurath, an Austrian social scientist, introduced graphic design in order to facilitate the understanding of various social and economic trends through the creative use of statistical charts. In 1924, Neurath advocated the establishment of the Museum of Economy and Society, an institution for public education and social information. In May 1925, the Museum's first graphical displays was opened to the public. The exhibition showed various complicated social and economic trends. By using charts which were to be intuitive and interesting the attempt was to make those concepts easy to grasp. This style of presentation at the time was called the Viennese method, but now it is known as ISOTYPE charts (International System of Typographic Picture Education).

Otto Neurath (1882–1945) was an enthusiast of sociology. After obtaining his PhD he worked on planning the war economy of the Austro-Hungarian empire. However, by 1919 he was engaged in the planning for a wholly new economic system of the chaotic and short-lived Bavarian Soviet Republic. He proposed for the abolition of money, but before this could be implemented, the republic was bloodily overthrown by Weimar's Social Democrats. Neurath escaped to Vienna, where he became an activist for the self-help squatters' movement. In the 1920s he joined the Vienna Circle of Logical Positivists, who attempted to establish a scientific foundation for philosophy; and at the same time he pioneered the graphic methods that became Isotype and were shown in the "Museum of Society and Economy". He fled Vienna after the collapse of its social democratic city government in 1934. Neurath's final years were spent in Britain, as postwar planner for the Midlands town of Bilston.

As Lupton argues: Neurath suggested "two central rules for generating the vocabulary of international pictures: reduction, for determining the style of individual signs; and consistency, for giving a group of signs the appearance of a coherent system". Reduction means finding the simplest expression of an object. For instance, silouette is a basic technique for reduction. It emulates the shadow of the image without any human intervention. Thus, it is a natural cast rather than a cultural interpretation. The sign as geometric representation of reality is both a rhetorical connotation and a practical technique for many symbol designers. Martin Krampen suggested "simplified realism;" he urged designers to "start from silhouette photographs of objects...and then by subtraction...obtain silouette pictographs."

Gerd Arntz (1900–1988) was born in a German family of traders and manufacturers. He was a socio-political activist in Düsseldorf, where he joined a movement that aimed to turn Germany into a radical-socialist state form. As a revolutionary artist, Arntz was connected to the Cologne-based ‘progressive artists group’ (Gruppe progressiver Künstler Köln) and depicted the life of workers and the class struggle in abstracted figures on woodcuts. Published in leftist magazines, his work was noticed by Otto Neurath who for his ‘Vienna method of visual statistics’ needed a designer of pictograms that could summarize a subject at a glance. Neurath invited the young artists to come to Vienna in 1928, and work on further developing his ISOTYPE. Arntz designed around 4000 different pictograms and abstracted illustrations for this system.

Neurath's motto was ‘words divide, images unite’. Many of his designs together with those of his protégé Gerd Arntz were the forebears of pictograms we now encounter everywhere, such as the man and woman on toilet doors. As Marina Vishmidt suggests: "Neurath's pictograms owe much to the Modernist belief that reality may be modified by being codified – standardised, easy-to-grasp templates as a revolution in human affairs.

Olympic pictograms 
The logos and pictograms for Olympic Games change every four years and the sponsoring city develops its own logos. Pictograms first appeared at the Olympics in London in 1948. They came into wide use, since they simultaneously communicate a message to a large number of people who speak different languages. In the absence of such signs in venues such as Olympic village there would be a need for many written signs in different languages, for example for rowing such as; Roning، Κωπηλασία، Aviron, قایق رانی،  and ボート競技 which not only would be costly but also may confuse the viewers. Symbols for individual sports developed by Masasa Katzoumie and Yoshiro Yamashita in Tokyo Olympics in 1964.

Pictograms in Mexico Olympic Games, 1968. A group of Olympic identity program designers collaborated on the creation of these symbols, which were employed to designate the events and installations for both the sports program and the Cultural Olympiad.

Inspired by the pictograms of Gerd Arntz, Otl Aicher, design director for the Munich 1972 games, in the words of Michael Bierut "developed a set of pictograms of such breathtaking elegance and clarity that they would never be topped. Aicher (1922-1991), founder of the Ulm design school and consultant to Braun and Lufthansa, was the quintessential German designer: precise, cool and logical".

Olympic Games pictograms of Barcelona in 1992 were influenced by Aicher's work. However, the geometric shapes were abandoned in favour of the characteristic line of the emblem created by Josep. M. Trias and its stylized simplification of the human body in three parts.

Twenty-four sport pictograms and a series of sport illustrations for the 2010 Winter Games are created by Dutch illustrator Irene Jacobs of I'm JAC Design.

Astronomical, statistical and scientific charts

Statistics is becoming increasingly more important in modern society. Various computer software can easily transform a large set of data into charts, graphs, and statistics of various types in an attempt to provide us with succinct information to make decisions.

Dynamic designs and computer animation

Pioneers of modern graphics and industrial design

Raymond Loewy was one of the best known industrial designers of the 20th century. Born in France, he spent most of his professional career in the United States. Among his many contributions were the Shell logo, the Greyhound bus, the S-1 locomotive, the Lucky Strike package, Coldspot refrigerators and the Studebaker Avanti. Loewy was first approached by the greyhound corporation to redesign its logo. The company's logo looked like a 'fat mongrel' he said. So, he created a slimmed-down version that is still used today.

William Golden is one of the pioneers of American graphic design. He was born in lower Manhattan, the youngest of twelve children. His only formal schooling was at the Vocational School for Boys, where he learned photoengraving and the basics of commercial design. In conjunction with the Didot typeface, Golden developed the famous CBS Eye logo. It has been suggested that the eye was inspired by an article in Alexey Brodovitch's Portfolio about the subject of Shaker design.

Placards and posters
Placard and posters existed from the ancient times. The Persian reliefs that depicted the important historical events; and the Greek axons and the Roman Albums, with their decorative designs and announcements, were quite similar to today's posters. In ancient Greece the name of athletes, and games schedules were written on columns that were slowly turning on an axis. Romans used whitewashed walls in their markets in which sellers, money lenders, and slave traders wrote their announcements and advertised for their products, and to attract the attention of customers they added attractive designs to their announcements.

Ancient reliefs

Emergence of the print and design industry
Around 1450, Johann Gutenberg's printing press made books widely available in Europe. The book design of Aldus Manutius developed the book structure which would become the foundation of western publication design. With the development of the lithographic process, invented by a Czech named Alois Senefelder in 1798 in Austria, the creation of posters become feasible. Although handmade posters existed before, they were mainly used for government announcements. William Caxton, who in 1477 started a printing company in England, produced the first printed poster.
In 1870, the advertising poster emerged.

Engraving
Engraving is the practice of incising a design onto a hard, usually flat surface, by cutting grooves into it. The process was developed in Germany in the 1430s from the engraving used by goldsmiths to decorate metalwork. Engravers use a hardened steel tool called a burin to cut the design into the surface, most traditionally a copper plate. Gravers come in a variety of shapes and sizes that yield different line types.

Etching
Etching is the process of using strong acid or mordant to cut into the unprotected parts of a metal surface to create a design in intaglio in the metal. This technique is believed to have been invented by Daniel Hopfer (c. 1470-1536) of Augsburg, Germany, who decorated armour in this way, and applied the method to printmaking. Etching soon came to challenge engraving as the most popular printmaking medium. Its great advantage was that, unlike engraving which requires special skill in metalworking, etching is relatively easy to learn for an artist trained in drawing.

Modern graphic design
In the second half of the 19th century William Morris's Kelmscott Press produced many historicist graphic designs, and created a collectors market for this kind of art. In Oxford he associated with artists like Burne-Jones, and Dante Gabriel Rossetti. Together they formed the Pre-Raphaelites group, and their ideas influenced the modern graphic design considerably.

In 1917, Frederick H. Meyer, director and instructor at the California School of Arts and Crafts, taught a class entitled “Graphic Design and Lettering”.

Posters Post-World War II
After the Second World War, with the emergence new color printing technology and particularly appearance of computers the art of posters underwent a new revolutionary phase. People can create color poster on their laptop computers and create color prints at a very low cost. Unfortunately, the high cost sophisticated printing processes can only be afforded mostly by the government entities and large corporations. With the emergence of internet the role of posters in conveying information has greatly diminished. However, some artist still use the chromolithography in order to create works of arts in the form of print. In this regard the difference between painting and print has been narrowed considerably.

Psychedelic design
The word "psychedelic"  means "mind manifesting". Psychedelic art is art inspired by the psychedelic experience induced by drugs, and refers above all to the art movement of the 1960s counterculture. Psychedelic visual arts were a counterpart to psychedelic rock music. Concert posters, album covers, lightshows, murals, comic books, underground newspapers and more reflected revolutionary political, social and spiritual sentiments inspired by psychedelic states of consciousness.

Although San Francisco remained the hub of psychedelic art into the early 1970s, the style also developed internationally. Pink Floyd worked extensively with London-based designers, Hipgnosis to create graphics to support the concepts in their albums like this cover of Soundtrack from the Film 'More'''. Life magazine's cover and lead article for the September 1, 1967 issue at the height of the Summer of Love focused on the explosion of psychedelic art on posters and the artists as leaders in the hippie counterculture community.

Yellow Submarine was a milestone in graphic design, inspired by the new trends in art, it sits alongside the dazzling Pop Art styles of Andy Warhol, Martin Sharp, Alan Aldridge and Peter Blake. Heinz Edelman was hired by TVC as the art director for this film. Before making Yellow Submarine, TVC had produced The Beatles, a 39 episode TV series "produced" by Al Brodax and King Features. Despite the critical acclaim of his design work for the film, Edelman never worked on another animated feature.

Peter Max's art work was a part of the psychedelic movement in graphic design. His work was much imitated in commercial illustration in the late 1960s and early 1970s. In 1970, many of Max's products and posters were featured in the exhibition "The World of Peter Max" which opened at the M.H. de Young Memorial Museum in San Francisco. He appeared on the cover of Life magazine with an eight-page feature article as well as The Tonight Show Starring Johnny Carson and The Ed Sullivan Show.

Poster design in Japan

The distinctive aesthetics of Japanese graphic design have been admired over many decades, winning awards at prestigious international venues.

The works of Japanese graphic designers are noted for their resourcefulness, powerful visual expression and extraordinary technical quality of print.

The distinctive artistic language and typographic sophistication show particularly in Japanese poster-design. The Japanese poster is a compelling pictorial medium and an original work of art, reflecting in full the designer's creative talent.

Chinese cultural revolution
The poster "Revolution promotes production", created by He Shuxui, celebrates traditional ceramic painting techniques. A plaque in the background commemorates a group of ceramic workers as an outstanding productive unit, 1974.

A worker named Wang Qing Cang created the poster "The three countries of Indo Zhina (Lao, Cambodia, Vietnam) will win!". On the upper left side, it says "Enemies are getting sicker and sicker every day, and we are getting better and better every day." (The U.S. supported Indo Zhina (Indochina) governments while China supported their communist guerilla forces.) October 1964.

The poster "Mao Ze Dong at Jing Gang Mountain" depicts a young Mao Ze Dong sitting against a background of Mount Jing Gang. Jing Gang Shan (Jing Gang Mountain) symbolizes the Mao Ze Dong leadership and his vision to unite the oppressed masses to fight against and fight against the ruling class. Created by Liu Chun Hua and Wang Hui, October 1969.

The poster, "Time is Money", features the famous Canadian doctor Norman Bethune (Dr. Bai Qiuen in Chinese), racing to rescue another patient. Bethune became an early proponent of universal health care, the success of which he observed during a visit to the Soviet Union. As a doctor in Montreal, Bethune frequently sought out the poor and gave them free medical care. As a thoracic surgeon, he traveled to Spain (1936–1937) and to China (1938–1939) to perform battlefield surgical operations on war casualties. Created by Zhang Xin Gua. Hebei People's Publishing House.

Culture and politics

Richard Avedon was an American photographer. Avedon capitalized on his early success in fashion photography and expanded into the realm of fine art. This is a solarised poster portraits of the Beatles, originally produced for 9 January 1967 edition of the American magazine Look.

The Barack Obama "hope" poster is an iconic image of Barack Obama designed by artist Shepard Fairey. The image became one of the most widely recognized symbols of Obama's campaign message, spawning many variations and imitations, including some commissioned by the Obama campaign. In January 2009, after Obama had won the election, Fairey's mixed-media stenciled portrait version of the image was acquired by the Smithsonian Institution for its National Portrait Gallery.

do

Computer aided graphic design in posters
With the arrival of computer aided graphic design an assortment of novel effects, digital techniques, and innovative styles have been emerged in poster designs. With software such as Adobe Photoshop, Corel and Windows' Paint program, image editing has become very cheap, and artists can experiment easily with a variety of color schemes, filters and special effects. For instance, utilizing various filters of Photoshop, many artists have created "vectored" designs in posters where a photographic image is solarized, sharpened, rendered into watercolor or stained glass effects or converted into bare lines with block colors. Other designs created soft or blurry styles, ripple or cascade effects and other special filters.

Advertising
Graphic design is used in advertising to announce a persuasive message by an identified sponsor; or a promotion by a firm of its products to its existing and potential customers. Egyptians used papyrus to make sales messages and wall posters. Commercial messages and political campaign displays have been found in the ruins of Pompeii and ancient Arabia. Lost and found advertising on papyrus was common in Ancient Greece and Ancient Rome. Wall or rock painting for commercial advertising is another manifestation of an ancient advertising form, which is present to this day in many parts of Asia, Africa, and South America.

Advertising in the 19th century

Advertising in the early 20th century

German Plakatstil, "Poster style"
In the early 20th century, Germany became the cradle of many of the avant-garde art movements particularly for posters. This created the "Plakatstil" or "Poster style" movement. This movement became very influential and had a considerable impact on the graphic design for posters. Posters in this style would feature few but strong colours, a sharp, non-cluttered, minimal composition and bold, clear types.

Ludwig Hohlwein

Ludwig Hohlwein was born in Germany in 1874. He was trained and practiced as an architect until 1906 when he switched to poster design. Hohlwein's adaptations of photographic images was based on a deep and intuitive understanding of graphical principles. His creative use of color and architectural compositions dispels any suggestion that he uses photos as a substitute for creative design.

for Riquet Pralinen Tea c. 1920–1926. Hohlwein was born in the Rhine-Main region of Germany, though he and his work are associated with Munich and Bavaria in southern Germany. There were two schools of Gebrauchsgrafik in Germany at the time, North and South. Hohlwein's high tonal contrasts and a network of interlocking shapes made his work instantly recognizable.

Poster historian Alain Weill comments that "Hohlwein was the most prolific and brilliant German posterist of the 20th century... Beginning with his first efforts, Hohlwein found his style with disconcerting facility. It would vary little for the next forty years. The drawing was perfect from the start, nothing seemed alien to him, and in any case, nothing posed a problem for him. His figures are full of touches of color and a play of light and shade that brings them out of their background and gives them substance"

Lucian Bernhard

Over the course of his career, which lasted well into the 1950s, Lucian Bernhard became a prolific designer not only of innovative posters but of trademarks, packaging, type, textiles, furniture, and interior design.

Advertising in the 1920-30 era

1972 Olympics and Otl Aicher posters
The internationally recognized artist Otl Aicher was a graphic designer, urban planner, photographer, and the mastermind behind the imagery for the 1972 Munich Olympics and the Rotis typeface. Growing as a child in Nazi Germany, Aicher, along with his friends Hans and Sophie Scholl, organized the anti-Nazi political organization Die Weisse Rose (the White Rose). In 1943, the Scholls and Aicher were arrested by the Nazi party. While Aicher was released, the Scholls went to trial where they were found guilty of treason and executed. After the war Aicher went on to help rebuild his ravaged city of Ulm and to found the influential international school of design, Hochschule für Gestaltung (HfG).

In Munich's original bid for 1972 Olympic one of the main promises was to create a synthesis between sport and art. Otl Aicher was appointed as the head of the committee's visual design group, and his mandate was to deploy art in a relatively new role of promoting this global public event. From the start, posters were high on the agenda of the organizing committee, and ideas were discussed as early as September 1967 to publish a series of art posters that would ‘relate artistic activity to the Olympic Games and engage the best artists to collaborate’, and also to commission an internationally known artist for the official poster.

Otl Aicher created the official posters for the 1972 Olympic Games in Munich. As he pointed out in his essay "Entwurf der Moderne" (Designing the Modern Era), the German word entwerfen, meaning "to draft "or "design", also contains the verb werfen, meaning "to throw". But where? To whom? What? And with what intention? As Benjamin Secher writes: "He devised an invigorating, almost Day-glo palette for the Olympics that was utterly free of red and black - banned for their association with the German flag. Athletes depicted in the official posters for each sport had their uniforms stripped of any national identifier, leaving the emphasis firmly on individual effort. Even the logo for the Games, a graphic of a radiant sun, hammered home the message of universality and, above all, optimism."

Aicher developed a comprehensive system to articulate the games' character across a wide range of materials, from signage to printed pieces and even staff uniforms. As the introduction to his exhibition at San Francisco Museum of Modern Art states: "His works including official posters and sporting event tickets, demonstrate the design tools Aicher used to join individual elements to the collective: structural grids, a bold and animating color palette, and ingenious pictograms. Aicher's orderly and pleasant design nimbly carried the weight of modern German history as it repositioned the nation's hospitality on the world stage".

This is a poster of 1972 Olympics Yachting in Germany designed by Otl Aicher. Using a bright color scheme, borrowed from 60s pop art and psychedelic art, and combining it with German modernism Aicher creates this visual graphic program.

Current advertising

Nike's My Butt is Big poster  appears to convey a bold and honest statement. The only part of a body in the picture is a butt. The text of a poem on the right repeats the curved form of the woman's bottom which is repeated again with some vividly colored splosh of red and purple dots in the background. The background is white, which contrasts with the darker skin of the model. The statement, "My butt is big" is red and larger than the rest of the poem.
Image:Courvoisier Cognac.jpg | This is a modern advertisement poster for Courvoisier Cognac. A balanced composition of the hands, feet, and face of the figure on a black background appear to convey the message of this poster.

This is a look alike poster advertisement for Wendy's "where's the Beef?" campaign. In the TV version of this ad, Clara Peller, a gray-haired actress, stared at an unimpressive looking hamburger and asked, "Where's the beef?" This simple message was so sharp that by asking the same question about his rival's program Vice President Walter Mondale effectively neutralized Colorado Senator Gary Hart's momentum in the 1984 presidential campaign.

This is a perfume advertisement for Chanel No 5. The combination of the female figure with the number 5, together with the striking color of dress have resulted in creation of its visual graphic impact.

Comics and graphic novels
A comic refers to a magazine or book of narrative artwork and, virtually always, dialog and descriptive prose. Despite the term, the subject matter in comic is not necessarily humorous; in fact, it is often serious and action-oriented. Due to the fact that graphic design constitutes the main foundation of comics it plays a crucial role in conveying various narratives through its compositional devices, line drawings and colouring scheme.

Conventional comics and pop art

Superman, from the cover art of Superman, issue 204 (April 2004). Art by Jim Lee and Scott Williams. Superman is widely considered to be an American cultural icon. Created by American writer Jerry Siegel and Canadian-born artist Joe Shuster in 1932. The character first appeared in Action Comics in 1938. The character's appearance is distinctive and iconic: a red, blue and yellow costume, complete with cape and with a stylized "S" shield on his chest.

Shang-Chi was created by writer Steve Englehart and artist Jim Starlin. He has no special superpowers, but he exhibits extraordinary skills in the martial arts. 1972

This is Steranko's Contessa Valentina Allegra di Fontaine, from Strange Tales, (Volume 168, May 1968). Lichtenstein's Drowning Girl, and its word balloon appears to have been inspired by a comic similar to this work.

Selecting the old-fashioned comic strip as subject matter, Roy Lichtenstein used the splash page of a romance story lettered by Ira Schnapp in Secret Hearts, (volume 83, November 1962), and slightly reworked the art and dialogue by re-lettering Schnapp's original word balloon. This precise composition, titled Drowning Girl (1963) is now part of the permanent collection of the Museum of Modern Art, New York.

Modern comics and graphic novels
Cover of  Wanted a graphic novel by Mark Millar, J. G. Jones, Paul Mounts.

The cover of  Too Cool to be Forgotten, a comics novel by Alex Robinson. Robinson's draftsmanship balances graphic panels with realism.

Poster for Persepolis (2000), L'Association French edition by Marjane Satrapi an Iranian graphic novelist. Persepolis was adapted into an animated film of the same name which debuted at the Cannes Film Festival in May 2007 and shared a Special Jury Prize.

Cover of Batman: The Killing Joke'' (1988). Art by Brian Bolland.

Web Design

Graphic design is used to make a web site understandable, memorable and attractive to the end user as well to present its content in a user friendly fashion. Graphic design ties in closely to user interface design and user experience design for the web, since aesthetics can impact how well people are able to interact with web content. The web dates back to the early 1980s at CERN, a European high energy physics research facility. Tim Berners-Lee who did the initial development stage was interested in the ability to link academic papers electronically and to utilize the internet in order to correspond with people in other laboratories around the world. He is credited with the construction of the first website in August 1991.

Modern life
Today graphic design has penetrated into all aspects of modern life. In particular modern architecture has been influenced by graphics.

References

Graphic design
Graphic design